Walter, Conston, Alexander & Green (officially Walter, Conston, Alexander & Green, P.C.) was a mid-sized full service New York-based law firm that existed from 1843-2001 when it merged with Atlanta-based Alston & Bird to launch the New York office of that national firm. The firm was formed with the merger of Walter, Conston & Schurtman established in 1955 by Otto Walter and Alexander & Green, an old-line firm established in 1843.

History
Alexander & Green was the launchpad for three former law clerks who went on to establish Simpson Thacher & Bartlett in 1884. It has been claimed that Henry Alexander of legacy firm Alexander & Green represented Samuel Clemens in a contract dispute but this incorrect.  It was attorney Daniel Whitford of Alexander & Green that represented Clemens' publishing Company Charles L. Webster Co. in 1885 and 1890. In a letter dated December 27, 1890 to Fred J. Hall, Clemens wrote "The real mistake was in trusting law business to an ignorant, blethering gas-pipe like Whitford. He is simply a damned fool-in Court-and will infallibly lose every suit you put into his hands." Alexander & Green later represented Mount Morris Bank in a collection action against Charles L. Webster Co. as part of the company's Assignment for the Benefit of Creditors filed in April of 1894. Clemens despised Mount Morris Bank and Whitford. In the later action Alexander & Green, through Whitford, was suspected of taking advantage of previous knowledge of Charles L. Webster & Company affairs in negotiations against his old client.  It was a white shoe firm that was one of the first of such historically Protestant institutions to accept Catholic attorneys and graduates from non-Ivy League law schools in the 1920s. Walter, Conston & Schurtman was a firm with an international orientation. Otto Walter was a German-born Jew who was prohibited from practicing law in Germany upon graduation due to Nazi restrictions. He fled to the United States and studied law at New York Law School. In the post-World War II years, Walter assisted in German-American reconciliation as an adviser to the German Ministry of Finance on various taxation and legal issues. Later his law firm went on to establish a strong German, Austrian and Swiss practice with a roster of bluechip German clients including Bertelsmann and Beiersdorf. It also had special expertise in e-commerce law, pharmaceutical, intellectual property, and telecommunications. The firm numbered some 54 attorneys in its New York headquarters and branch offices in Darien, CT and Munich, Germany.

For a short time subsequent to the merger with Alston & Bird, in an attempt to preserve some of the name recognition of the well-regarded Walter, Conston firm, the New York office operated under the moniker "Walter, Conston, Alexander & Green, the New York Office of Alston & Bird."  Since the 2001 merger, many of the attorneys that practiced in the international area during the Walter, Conston era have left the firm.

References

Law firms based in New York City
Defunct law firms of the United States
Law firms established in 1843
Law firms disestablished in 2001
Defunct companies based in New York (state)
1843 establishments in New York (state)
2001 disestablishments in New York (state)